The Sun Comes Out Every Day (Spanish:El sol sale todos los días) is a 1958 Spanish comedy film directed by Antonio del Amo and starring Marisa de Leza, Enrique Diosdado and Mercedes Monterrey.

The film's sets were designed by Enrique Alarcón.

Cast

 Marisa de Leza as Lina
 Enrique Diosdado as Diógenes
 Mercedes Monterrey as Teresa
 Barta Barrias Pelotti
 Luis Pérez de León as Sr. Román
 Francisco Bernal as Portero del hospital
 Daja-Tarto as Ravi Ramátraka
 Manuel Aguilera as Guardia civil
 Aníbal Vela as Alcalde
 Manuel Guitián as Trabajador en feria
 Ángel Calero
 Ernesto Lerín
 Enrique Bendicho
 Matilde Guarnerio
 Rodolfo del Campo
 Guillermo Méndez
 Miguel Ángel Rodríguez as Gorrión

References

Bibliography 
 D'Lugo, Marvin. Guide to the Cinema of Spain. Greenwood Publishing, 1997.

External links 
 

1958 comedy films
Spanish comedy films
1958 films
1950s Spanish-language films
Films directed by Antonio del Amo
Films scored by Jesús García Leoz
1950s Spanish films